Santeri Vuoti (born 1 February 1995) is a Finnish ice hockey player. He is currently playing with Lempäälän Kisa in the Finnish Mestis.

Vuoti made his Liiga debut playing with HPK during the 2014–15 Liiga season.

References

External links

1995 births
Living people
Finnish ice hockey forwards
HPK players
Lempäälän Kisa players
Ilves players
SaiPa players
People from Hyvinkää
Sportspeople from Uusimaa